Laucesa Parish is an administrative unit of Augšdaugava Municipality in the Selonia region of Latvia. The administrative centre is the village of Mirnijs.

 
Parishes of Latvia
Selonia